Sidney Hordern Myer is an Australian businessman and philanthropist with strong associations with ongoing relations between Australia and Asia. He is a grandson of Sidney Myer and Dame Merlyn Myer. Since graduating from Monash University with a Bachelor of Economics and a Graduate Diploma of Marketing, Myer has been exposed to over 25 years of business experience.

Myer is currently involved in a diverse array of organisations and companies, which include:
 Chairman of Asialink
 Director of The Myer Family Company Holdings - an unlisted family investment company with a dense focus on Asia, as well as the financial services industry and investment markets in Australia
 Chief Executive Officer of Yulgilbar Group of Companies
 Director of OC Funds Management - an Australian boutique funds management company
 Trustee of The Sidney Myer Estate
 Chairman of the Beyond Australia Task Force - a Task Force of The Myer Foundation that advocates Australian programs in Asia and the Pacific
 Chairman of the National Asian Languages and Studies in Schools Ministerial Reference Group
  Chairman Zoos Victoria Foundation
 Actively involved in Sidney Myer Fund and the Myer Foundation
 Was involved with charities helping children with cancer

Myer continues to speak and facilitate at numerous international and local forums including the Asialink National Forum, The Asialink Conversations, Generation 21, ASEAN Australia New Zealand Dialogue.

External links
 Asia Education Foundation
Sidney Myer Fund and The Myer Foundation

References

University of Melbourne alumni
Australian people of Belarusian-Jewish descent
Philanthropists from Melbourne
Businesspeople from Melbourne
Australia–Asia relations
Living people
Place of birth missing (living people)
Year of birth missing (living people)
Myer family
Monash University alumni